Ammar International Popular Film Festival (AIPFF) was held between 2010 and 2016 in Tehran, Iran and showcased international documentary film, fictions, animations, clips, music videos, photo albums and other kinds of media with a focus on social and economic issues.  Notable contributing filmmakers have included Danny Schechter and John Pilger.

Nader Talebzadeh is founder and secretary of the festival. The head of AIPFF Policy Council is the Iranian writer and film critic Vahid Jalili  The festival was introduced from the outset as a revolutionary alternative to Iranian documentary cinema.

Origin 
The name derives from Ammar, one of the companions of the Islamic Prophet, who is said to have favored truth and resolved doubts.

One of the innovations at APFF, and the reason for it being called "popular", is that the winning films are screened at masjids, schools, universities, auditoriums, public parks, theaters and other places across the country.

The first festival, thought to be a one-off initiative, was held on the first anniversary of the Eighty-Eight Intrigue.  Just twenty works were screened simultaneously at 30 points around the country.  The following year, organisers called for films on specific topics (the history of the Islamic Revolution, the soft war, the December 30 rally, and the Islamic Awakening). 320 works were submitted by artists and filmmakers, which were screened at 300 points across the country.  This grew to 900 works in the third festival.

2013 International Festival 
In 2013, the fourth festival was opened up to international entries.  1700 domestic and 500 international works participated, with simultaneous screenings covering all provinces of the country throughout the year.

Special Awards: Christian Zionism: The Tragedy and the Turning (USA); The Stones Cry Out (Italy).
Golden Lanterns:  Plunder: The Crime of our Time (USA); A Path to Gaza Prison Camp (UK); The Unclear Truth (UK).
Tablets of Honor:  Valentino's Ghost (USA);  The Money Lobby (Iran), Between Anvil and Hammer (Iran).

2014 International Festival 
The fifth festival had screenings at hundreds of national points throughout the year. 1700 domestic and 500 international works participated in the festival. The simultaneous screenings covered all provinces of the country and increased to more than 2500 points.

Golden Lantern: America's Surveillance State (USA)
Tablets of Honor:  The Writer with No Hands (UK); These Walls Will Talk (Iran)

See also 

 Tehran Times

 Nader Talebzadeh

References

Film festivals in Tehran